The Insurance Repository in India is a database of insurance policies. It allows policy holders to make revisions to a policy. It launched on 16 September 2013. It is the world's first of its kind.

India's Insurance Regulatory and Development Authority originally issued licenses to five entities to act as Insurance Repositories; however, SHCIL Projects Limited surrendered its Insurance Repository license in September 2015. The remaining four are:

CDSL Insurance Repository Limited (CDSL IR)
Karvy Insurance Repository Limited
 National Insurance-policy Repository by NSDL Database Management Limited
CAMS Insurance Repository Services Limited

All such entities must contain the words "Insurance Repository" in their names.

References

External links 
  Insurance Regulatory and Development Authority
 Handbook of Insurance Repository 
 Benefits of eIA

 
2013 in India